Ostmark Danzig was a German association football club from the city of Danzig, West Prussia (today Gdańsk, Poland). Established at 1. September 1909, the club was notable only for its advance to the regional first division Baltenverband final in 1910–11. After receiving a quarterfinal bye, the team beat SV Marienwerder before losing the championship match 4–2 to Lituania Tilsit. The team disappeared following World War II when the city became part of Poland.

External links 
Das deutsche Fußball-Archiv historical German domestic league tables 
Der Fußball in Ostpreussen und Danzig football in East Prussia and Danzig

References

Football clubs in Germany
Defunct football clubs in Germany
Defunct football clubs in former German territories
Sport in Gdańsk
History of Gdańsk